John Quincy Emery (September 15, 1843 – August 6, 1928) was an American educator and civil servant.

Early life and education 
Born in Liberty, Ohio, he moved with his parents to Albion, Wisconsin. He attended Albion Academy in Dane County, Wisconsin, where he graduated in 1866. He then became a teacher.

Career 
After fighting in the American Civil War, Emery returned to education. He served as the school supervisor and principal at River Falls Normal School (now the University of Wisconsin–River Falls). He served as the Superintendent of Public Instruction of Wisconsin from 1895 to 1899. Later he was appointed Wisconsin Dairy and Food Commissioner. When he retired in 1926, he was Wisconsin's oldest state employee at the age of 83.

Death 
Emery died at Wisconsin General Hospital in Madison, Wisconsin at the age of 84.

Notes

External links

1843 births
1928 deaths
People from Trumbull County, Ohio
Educators from Wisconsin
Superintendents of Public Instruction of Wisconsin
University of Wisconsin–River Falls faculty
People from Albion, Dane County, Wisconsin
People of Wisconsin in the American Civil War